Philip Upali Wijewardene (17 February 1938 – 13 February 1983) was a Sri Lankan business magnate. Considered one of the best-known entrepreneurs in Sri Lanka, Wijewardene had accumulated a net worth of US$50 million by 1983. He was the founder and chairman of Upali Group, the first multi-national business in Sri Lanka, which had businesses in the US, UK, Malaysia, Thailand, Singapore and Hong Kong. The Upali Group diversified from confectionery to electronics and automobile manufacturing, publishing, print media, leisure and aviation. It developed many brands, such as Kandos, Delta, Unic, Upali Air, Upali Mazda and Upali Newspapers, which Insight Magazine UK said was achieved "largely through bravado and wit."

Upali Wijewardene was presumed dead on 13 February 1983 when his private Learjet disappeared soon after leaving Malaysia en route to Colombo over the Straits of Malacca.

Early life and family

Upali Wjewardana was born on 17 February 1938 at his paternal grandmother's house in Sri Ramya, Colombo, to Don Walter Tudugalle Wijewardene and Anula Kalyanawathie Wijesinghe. He was the youngest and only son; he had two older sisters: Anoja and Kalyani. The Wijewardene family were from Kelaniya. His grandfather Muhandiram Don Phillip Wijeywardene, a timber merchant, founded the family business his father joined. Upali lost his father when he was eighteen months old and was raised by his mother in the family home Sedawatte Walawwe in Kolonnawa. 

The Wijewardene family had made its fortune supplying timber for construction in the city of Colombo. They reinvested the profits in many ventures, including real estate. The family became influential in local politics. Upali's paternal uncle, Don Richard Wijewardena, was the press baron, and his cousin J. R. Jayewardene would become President. Ray Wijewardene, the inventor, was his cousin. His sister Anoja married Stanley Wijesundera, who became a professor of Chemistry and first vice-chancellor of the University of Colombo, while his other sister Kalyani married Dr G.M. Attygalle. 

On 7 November 1975, he married Lakmini Ratwatte, daughter of Dr Seevali Ratwatte, brother of Sirimavo Bandaranaike. She is the granddaughter of Barnes Ratwatte Dissawa.  He moved to his house in Thurstan Road, designed by Geoffrey Bawa, which included its helipad for his private helicopter. He also had a country house, the Sunnycroft Bungalow, in Nuwara Eliya. He was the Basnayake Nilame (chief lay custodian) of the Kelaniya Raja Maha Vihara, which his family had supported. An amateur racing enthusiast, Wijewardene raced his mother's Opel Kapitan at the Katukurunde Races in the early 1960s.<ref>

Education 
He attended Ladies' College, Colombo, with his two older sisters and, after that, attended Royal College, Colombo, then St John's School, Leatherhead. He went on to study economics at Queens College, Cambridge in 1956, graduating in 1959 with a BA. At Cambridge he was a secretary of the Marshall Society.

Early ventures  
On his return to Ceylon in 1959, Upali joined the British manufacturing company Lever Brothers as a management trainee and was placed in charge of soap processing. He left Lever Brothers in 1961 following a disagreement with its British Chairman.

Delta toffee
He went into business on his own by starting a confectionary business by putting a candy ball machine on his land on Bloemendaal Road. He developed the venture into the brand called 'Delta Toffee'. 

Kandos chocolates
In 1970, following the death of his maternal uncle Senator Sarath Chandradasa Wijesinghe, he took over his poorly performing Ceylon Chocolates Company. He developed its 'Kandos chocolates' brand into an international brand. With the help of his friend Ratnam, he cultivated 14,000 acres of cocoa in Malaysia and acquired cocoa plantations processing plants and factories in Malaysia, Singapore and Thailand.

Upali Group
With the success of Delta and Kandos,  Upali Wijewardana consolidated his holdings and founded the Upali Group of Companies during the mid-1960s, as he developed a conglomerate of companies. 

A British journalist, Matt Miller, described him in Insight Magazine: "Largely through bravado and wit, Philip Upali Wijewardene parlayed a bankrupt confectionery plant into Sri Lanka's only multi-national business group and one of Asia's leading cocoa-based products conglomerates. Intriguingly, he accomplished his overseas empire-building at a time when his country strictly prohibited currency export. And now the 43-year-old commodity wizard (this was 1981) has started what could be Upali's Third Plan. He says with uncharacteristic restraint that he would be willing to become Sri Lanka's president someday".

Manufacturing 
Upali began soap manufacturing, introducing the brands Crystal and Tingle Sikuru.

Aviation
In the aviation sector, he founded Upali Air in 1968. However, its operations started in the later 1970s with several aircraft for private, domestic and international flights.

Electronics 
He started the Upali Electronic Company in the 1970s introducing Unic Radios, Calculators, Wall Clocks, Air-conditioners and NEC TVs. These were assembled locally under the import restrictions of the time. 

Automotive 
In 1970, Wijewardene founded the Upali Motor Company (UMC), which began assembly of Mazda Capellas under license in his Homagama plant, known locally as the UMC Mazda or, more colonially, Upali Mazda. Over 500 units were assembled. In 1978, UMC began the assembly of Fiat 128, known locally as Upali Fiat.   

Print media
In 1981, he started Upali Newspapers and published daily and weekly newspapers, including Divaina, The Island and Navaliya. He used his aircraft to deliver newspapers to remote areas such as Anuradhapura and Jaffna before 8 am. In February 1981, he published a comic, Chithra Mithra. Within a few months, the magazine reached a circulation of 200,000. Media initially described the magazine as "romance, booze, money, travel, dreams, adventure, wild women", crammed into 16 pages. It expanded into 32 pages with a different story on every page. Editor Janaka Ratnayake noted that the publication had "many topics-romance, detective, sci-fi, heroes, two pages built around movie stars, and almost a page of pen pal" (1993). All the stories were serialised and in black and white with a spot of one colour. The comic magazine fell apart after Wijewardene's death and ceased publication in 1986 with a circulation of 15,000. Ratnayake cited the magazine's failure to Wijewardene's early end, the sub-standard printing quality of the paper due to unskilled mechanics and competition from other magazines.

In 1980, he travelled to Silicon Valley and signed five agreements, including one with Motorola. The construction of chip plants started in 1983. However, the Sri Lankan Civil war brought bombing over the country and killed some of the engineers assigned to the construction of the plants, which led the chip manufacturers to leave Sri Lanka in favour of Malaysia.

Horse racing
Upali Wijewardene was influential in restarting horse racing at the Nuwara Eliya Race Course. He was the chairman Board of Stewards of the Sri Lanka Turf Club and was a keen turfite who raced in Sri Lanka and England, where his horse "Rasa Penang" won the Jersey Stakes at Royal Ascot, ridden by the world-famous jockey Lester Piggott.

In 1980 he also won the Singapore Derby at the Bukit Timah Race Course in Singapore and the Perak Derby at the Perak Turf Club in Malaysia with his horse, named "Vaaron". He raced "General Atty" too and won many races in England. He flew to all these countries in his private aircraft, where his horses ran. He made it a point to fly from Newmarket Racecourse in England to Nuwara Eliya Racecourse in Sri Lanka to watch his horses and ponies racing.

Government
In 1978, Upali Wijewardene was appointed by President J. R. Jayewardene as the first Director General of the Greater Colombo Economic Commission (GCEC), which evolved into the Board of Investment of Sri Lanka. The Sri Lankan political establishment did not favour his arrival in politics. In this position, Wijewardene worked to attract foreign investment to develop local industries in the new open economy. He formed Free Trade Zones in Katunayake, Biyagama and Koggala. He set up an organization called 'Ruhunu Udanaya' and worked hard to create opportunities for young people in Kamburupitiya and the surrounding areas to learn English and computer technology. It was claimed that Upali laid the groundwork to enter parliament, with Kamburupitiya serving as a possible constituency.

Disappearance

Upali, who travelled on a Sri Lankan diplomatic passport as Chairmen of the GCEC, was licensed as a pilot at the time, spent about 20 million rupees in local currency and added another controller to the rear body in addition to the pilot controller. On 13 February 1983, his private jet, a Learjet 35A, took off from Kuala Lumpur at 8:41 pm, bound for Colombo. On board with him were his Malaysian lawyer S.M. Ratnam, Upali Group Director Ananda Peli Muhandiram, pilot Capt. Noel Anandappa (ex-SLAF), co-pilot Sydney Soysa, and steward S. Senenakye. Fifteen minutes later, the aircraft disappeared while flying over the Straits of Malacca. Extensive search operations by air and naval units of Sri Lanka, India, the United States, the Soviet Union, Australia, Indonesia, and Malaysia failed to locate any evidence of a crash.

A wheel that was suspected of being part of the disappeared plane was found on Pandang Island, leading the authority to conclude that it was a mid-air explosion. Later investigations revealed that the plane manufacturer did not manufacture this wheel. According to K. Godage, former Malaysian High Commissioner, the government of Sri Lanka did not show interest in further investigating the disappearance. Runners were rifled that Upali had been tipped to be named the Minister of Finance the next day on his return to Colombo, replacing Ronnie de Mel by President J. R. Jayewardene.

See also
List of people who disappeared
Upali Air
Upali Newspapers

References

Further reading

External links
 Wijewardene House, Colombo, Sri Lanka

1938 births
1983 deaths
1980s missing person cases
Alumni of Royal College, Colombo
People educated at St John's School, Leatherhead
Alumni of Queens' College, Cambridge
Missing air passengers
Missing people
Missing person cases in Sri Lanka
Sinhalese businesspeople
Sri Lankan Buddhists
Sri Lankan mass media owners
Sri Lankan aviators
Upali